Malmurzyn  is a village in the administrative district of Gmina Mniów, within Kielce County, Świętokrzyskie Voivodeship, in south-central Poland.

The village has a population of 153.

References

Malmurzyn